The Foxcon Terrier 200 is an Australian light-sport aircraft, designed and produced by Foxcon Aviation of Mackay, Queensland. The aircraft is supplied as a kit for amateur construction or as a complete ready-to-fly-aircraft.

Design and development
The Terrier 200 was designed to comply with the US light-sport aircraft rules. It features a strut-braced high-wing, a two-seats-in-side-by-side configuration enclosed cockpit, fixed tricycle landing gear and a single engine in tractor configuration.

The aircraft is made from vacuum-molded composites with the design goal of strength at a light weight. Its  span wing employs a Chris Mark 4 airfoil and mounts flaps. The standard engines available in 2012 were the  D-Motor LF26, the  Rotax 912ULS, the  Subaru EA 81 and the  Lycoming IO-233-LSA four-stroke powerplants. By 2015 only the Subaru EA 81 and Rotax 912ULS were still offered. Floats for water operations are optional.

Variants
Terrier 200
Base model with two molded individual seats.
Terrier 200C
Model with bench seats that fold into a  bed for camping.

Specifications (Terrier 200)

References

External links

Homebuilt aircraft
Light-sport aircraft
Single-engined tractor aircraft
Foxcon Aviation aircraft